Hinah (Arabic: حينة) is a Syrian village in the Qatana District of the Rif Dimashq Governorate. According to the Syria Central Bureau of Statistics (CBS), Hinah had a population of 1,524 in the 2004 census.

History

In 1838, Eli Smith noted Hinah's population as Druze and Orthodox Christian.

References

Bibliography

 

Populated places in Qatana District